Calophyllum tetrapterum is a species of flowering plant in the Calophyllaceae family. It is found in Brunei, Cambodia, India, Indonesia, Malaysia, Singapore, Thailand, and Vietnam.

References

tetrapterum
Flora of Indomalesia
Least concern plants
Taxonomy articles created by Polbot